Sasquatch Provincial Park is a provincial park in Kent, British Columbia, Canada.

History
The park was established 1968, in its present condition. It actually began in 1959 as a 20 hectare inland fjord called Green Point Park, which was expanded into a picnicking area in 1960. Eight years later the park was expanded greatly and renamed. It was named after Sasquatch (a Halkomelem Salish word), the cryptid said to be endemic to the area.

Geography
The park is 1217 hectares in size. It is characterized by a series of pocket lakes, a unique second-growth and birch forest, and scenic mountain ridges.

The park is located in the District of Kent, 6 kilometres north of Harrison Hot Springs, British Columbia.

Conservation
Wildlife: tailed frogs, beavers, mountain goats, bears, deer, and Sasquatch
Fish: sturgeon, smelt, rainbow trout, cutthroat trout, brook char, salmon, catfish, and stickleback 
Birds: bald eagles, woodpeckers, warblers, and vireos
Insect: black petaltail dragonfly

Recreation
The following recreational activities are available: vehicle accessible camping, picnicking, hiking, interpretive walks, swimming, canoeing, kayaking, motorised boating, fishing, windsurfing, and waterskiing.

See also
List of British Columbia Provincial Parks
List of Canadian provincial parks

References

External links

Lower Mainland
Lillooet Ranges
Provincial parks of British Columbia
Protected areas established in 1968
1968 establishments in British Columbia